Witold Gesing (born 4 May 1949) is a Canadian sailor. He competed in the Star event at the 1984 Summer Olympics.

References

External links
 

1949 births
Living people
Canadian male sailors (sport)
Olympic sailors of Canada
Sailors at the 1984 Summer Olympics – Star
Sportspeople from Kraków